The 1987 World Fencing Championships were held in Lausanne, Switzerland.

Medal table

Medal summary

Men's events

Women's events

References

FIE Results

World Fencing Championships
F
1987 in Swiss sport
Sports competitions in Lausanne
1987 in fencing
20th century in Lausanne